The 2017 CONCACAF Beach Soccer Championship was a beach soccer tournament which took place in Nassau from 20 to 26 February 2017. This was the second time that the CONCACAF Beach Soccer Championship was held in the Bahamas. All matches were played at the Malcolm Beach Soccer Facility.

The tournament aimed to crown the best beach soccer nation on the continent and also served as the FIFA Beach Soccer World Cup qualifier for teams from North, Central America and Caribbean which are members of CONCACAF, where the top two teams qualified for the 2017 FIFA Beach Soccer World Cup also to be held in the Bahamas.

In a shock turn of events, the considerably inexperienced Panama thwarted all four of the nations who have dominated the tournament historically to surprisingly claim their first title. Panama's group stage victory all but condemned 2015 runners up Costa Rica to their earliest ever exit, their defeat of two-time winners, the United States, in the quarter-finals also ensured the Americans' most premature departure. They then defeated former World Cup semi-finalists El Salvador in the semi-finals and three time and defending champions Mexico in the final.

As the finalists, Panama and Mexico qualified for the World Cup, the former for the first time (and the first new North American World Cup debutants since 2009), the latter for the fifth time.

This was a groundbreaking CONCACAF Beach Soccer Championship; it marked only the second time in the seven championships to date (other than in 2006) that the quartet of Costa Rica, El Salvador, the United States and Mexico did not all finish together in some combination in first through fourth place.

Participating teams and draw
The following 16 teams entered the tournament.

North American Zone

Central American Zone

Caribbean Zone

 (hosts)
 (replaced  of Central American Zone)

Notes
Bahamas has already qualified for the FIFA Beach Soccer World Cup as hosts.
Guadeloupe is not a FIFA member and thus ineligible to qualify for the FIFA Beach Soccer World Cup.
Should Bahamas and/or Guadeloupe advance to the final, the next eligible highest-placed team would qualify for the FIFA Beach Soccer World Cup.
On 28 October 2016, FIFA suspended the National Football Federation of Guatemala for political interference by the Government of Guatemala. Until the suspension is lifted, Guatemalan teams are not permitted to participate in international competitions. CONCACAF had set the deadline of 16 December 2016 for the suspension to be lifted, otherwise by rule, Guatemala would be disqualified from the 2017 CONCACAF Beach Soccer Championship, and any replacement team or revision to the tournament format would be discussed once the deadline had passed. On 23 December, CONCACAF announced that Barbados would take the place of Guatemala.

The draw of the tournament was held on 17 October 2016, 10:00 UTC−4, at the Intercontinental Hotel in Doral, Florida. The 16 teams were drawn into four groups of four teams, with the following seeding based on the BSWW Beach Soccer rankings:

Notes
The draw started by selecting from a separate pot, which contained the five teams (Antigua and Barbuda, Belize, Guadeloupe, Turks and Caicos Islands, U.S. Virgin Islands) with the same exact ranking (38). These teams were drawn and placed into Pots 3 and 4 respectively to complete the distribution of the teams into those Pots.
Guatemala were initially part of the draw, but were replaced by Barbados afterwards.

Group stage
Each team earns three points for a win in regulation time, two points for a win in extra time, one point for a win in a penalty shoot-out, and no points for a defeat. The top two teams from each group advance to the quarter-finals, while the bottom two teams from each group enter the placement stage for 9th to 16th place.

All times are local, EST (UTC−5).

Group A

Group B

Group C

Group D

Placement stage (9th–16th place)

Bracket (9th–12th place)

Bracket (13th–16th place)

13th place first round

9th place first round

13th place second round

9th place second round

15th place match

13th place match

11th place match

9th place match

Knockout stage
The quarter-final matchups were decided by a draw, with the group winners matched up with the group runners-up.

Bracket (1st–4th place)

Bracket (5th–8th place)

Quarter-finals

5th place semi-finals

Semi-finals
The winners qualified for the 2017 FIFA Beach Soccer World Cup.

7th place match

5th place match

3rd place match

Final

Awards

Winners

Individual awards
The following awards were given at the conclusion of the tournament.

Top goalscorers

12 goals
 Ramón Maldonado
 Marlon Meza
11 goals
 Lesly St. Fleur
9 goals
 Alessandro Canale
8 goals
 Jose Ruiz
 Ruben Batres
 Rohan Reid
 Sebastien Hell

7 goals
 Billy Forbes
 César Saldivar
 Omarie Daniel
 Greivin Pacheco
 Kevon Woodley
 Deshawn Joseph
6 goals
 Marc Jankovic
 Alfonso Maquensi
 Jamal Haynes
 Melvin Segovia

Final ranking

Qualified teams for FIFA Beach Soccer World Cup
The following three teams from CONCACAF qualified for the 2017 FIFA Beach Soccer World Cup, including Bahamas which qualified as hosts.

1 Bold indicates champion for that year. Italic indicates host for that year.

References

Qualification CONCACAF
2017
2017 in beach soccer
2016–17 in CONCACAF football